The Facebook Aquila is an experimental solar-powered drone developed by Facebook for use as an atmospheric satellite, intended to act as relay stations for providing internet access to remote areas.

It first flew on 28 June 2016 with a second aircraft successfully flying in 2017. Internal development of the Aquila aircraft was stopped in June 2018.

Development

Aquila was developed by Facebook's Connectivity Lab. The prototype airframe design and construction was led by Ascenta, a Somerset, England-based company acquired by Facebook in 2014.
Several scale models of the Aquila were built and flown to prove the concept prior to the full scale prototype being built.

Following construction at Ascenta's factory in Bridgwater, England, the Aquila prototype was disassembled and shipped to Arizona, where it was first flown on 28 June 2016. The 96-minute flight was considered successful. However, during landing, the aircraft touched down short of the intended landing zone and was damaged; the National Transportation Safety Board conducted an investigation into the accident, as the drone suffered a structural failure just before touching down. The aircraft was designed such that a production version would be able to support continuous flight in the stratosphere for 90 days.

Following the crash, the prototype Aquila was modified with spoilers, provision for feathering the propellers, and refinement of the exterior surface of the aircraft; the second flight took place on 22 May 2017, with the one-hour, 46-minute flight being considered successful.
In November 2017, a partnership with Airbus was announced to further development of the Aquila and the "high altitude platform station broadband connectivity system" (HAPS) project.
The same month, it was announced that Aquila would be displayed at the Victoria and Albert Museum's spring "The Future Starts here" exhibition in 2018.

In June 2018, as aerospace manufacturers start designing and building HAPS, Facebook decided to stop its program to work with partners like Airbus on HAPS connectivity and their technologies like flight control and high-density batteries. In 2018, it was reported that Facebook and Airbus have scheduled test flights in Australia using the latter's Zephyr drone technology. Zephyr share the same blueprint with Aquila as it also uses solar power.

Design
The drone has a wingspan roughly the same as a Boeing 737, but weighs only . Aquila is of flying wing configuration, the upper surface of the wing being covered in solar cells to power the aircraft's four electric motors; batteries, composing half the aircraft's weight, provide power storage for night flight. Aquila is claimed to use the same amount of power as three blow dryers. While the prototype used a launch trolley to become airborne, production Aquilas are intended to be launched using helium balloons, carrying the aircraft to their operational height and releasing them; landings would take place on grassy surfaces.

The technology, which used high-bandwidth lasers to beam the Internet to remote locations, was intended to provide access to 4 billion users, particularly in sub-Saharan Africa.

Specifications

See also

References

External links
"The technology behind Aquila", Facebook.com

Solar-powered aircraft
Flying wings
Four-engined tractor aircraft
2010s British experimental aircraft
Aircraft first flown in 2016
Facebook
Ascenta aircraft